Raymond William Jansen (born January 16, 1889 – March 19, 1934), was an American professional baseball player who played third base in the Major Leagues in  for the  St. Louis Browns.

He was born and died in St. Louis, Missouri.

Ray Jansen had a very short (one game) but unique career in Major League Baseball. On September 30, 1910, with only eight games remaining in the Browns' season, the club—55 games out of first place—called on Jansen to play third base. Although the 21-year-old local boy had never played a professional game in his life, Jansen notched four singles in five at-bats. In the field he was less impressive, with three errors in ten total chances. The Browns lost the game to the Chicago White Sox, 9–1, and Jansen never played in the majors again. Jansen's four hits still is the record for the most hits in a one-game MLB career.

Jansen played for Class D Keokuk, Iowa in 1911 and stayed in the minors until 1918, making it up to Class A (then one step below the majors) Southern Association, but never made it back to the big leagues.

References

External links

1889 births
1934 deaths
St. Louis Browns players
Major League Baseball infielders
Baseball players from Missouri
Fort Wayne Champs players
Mobile Sea Gulls players
Birmingham Barons players